The bomb pulse is the sudden increase of carbon-14 (14C) in the Earth's atmosphere due to the hundreds of aboveground nuclear bombs tests that started in 1945 and intensified after 1950 until 1963, when the Limited Test Ban Treaty was signed by the United States, the Soviet Union and the United Kingdom. These hundreds of blasts were followed by a doubling of the relative concentration of 14C in the atmosphere. We discuss “relative concentration”, because measurements of 14C levels by mass spectrometers are most accurately made by comparison to another carbon isotope, often the common isotope 12C.  Isotope abundance ratios are not only more easily measured, they are what 14C carbon daters want, since it is the fraction of carbon in a sample that is 14C, not the absolute concentration, that is of interest in dating measurements.  The figure shows how the fraction of carbon in the atmosphere that is 14C, of order only a part per trillion, has changed over the past several decades following the bomb tests.  Because 12C concentration has increased by about 30% over the past fifty years, the fact that “pMC”, measuring the isotope ratio, has returned (almost) to its 1955 value, means that 14C concentration in the atmosphere remains some 30% higher than it once was. Carbon-14, the radioisotope of carbon, is naturally developed in trace amounts in the atmosphere and it can be detected in all living organisms. Carbon of all types is continually used to form the molecules of the cells of organisms. Doubling of the concentration of 14C in the atmosphere is reflected in the tissues and cells of all organisms that lived around the period of nuclear testing. This property has many applications in the fields of biology and forensics.

Background 
The radioisotope carbon-14 is constantly formed from nitrogen-14 (14N) in the higher atmosphere by incoming cosmic rays which generate neutrons. These neutrons collide with 14N to produce 14C which then combines with oxygen to form 14CO2. This radioactive CO2 spreads through the lower atmosphere and the oceans where it is absorbed by the plants and the animals that eat the plants. The radioisotope 14C thus becomes part of the biosphere so that all living organisms contain a certain amount of 14C. Nuclear testing caused a rapid increase in atmospheric 14C (see figure), since the explosion of an atomic bomb also creates neutrons which collide again with 14N and produce 14C. Since the ban on nuclear testing in 1963, atmospheric 14C relative concentration is slowly decreasing at a pace of 4% annually. This continuous decrease permits scientists to determine among others the age of deceased people and allows them to study cell activity in tissues. By measuring the amount of 14C in a population of cells and comparing that to the amount of 14C in the atmosphere during or after the bomb pulse, scientists can estimate when the cells were created and how often they've turned over since then.

Difference with classical radiocarbon dating 
Radiocarbon dating has been used since 1946 to determine the age of organic material as old as 50,000 years. As the organism dies, the exchange of 14C with the environment ceases and the incorporated 14C decays. Given the steady decay of radioisotopes (the half-life of 14C is about 5,730 years), the relative amount of 14C left in the dead organism can be used to calculate how long ago it died. Bomb pulse dating should be considered a special form of carbon dating. As discussed above and in the Radiolab episode, Elements (section 'Carbon'),  in bomb pulse dating the slow absorption of atmospheric 14C by the biosphere, can be considered as a chronometer. Starting from the pulse around the years 1963 (see figure), atmospheric radiocarbon relative abundance decreased by about 4% a year. So in bomb pulse dating it is the relative amount of 14C in the atmosphere that is decreasing and not the amount of 14C in a dead organisms, as is the case in classical radiocarbon dating. This decrease in atmospheric 14C can be measured in cells and tissues and has permitted scientists to determine the age of individual cells and of deceased people. These applications are very similar to the experiments conducted with pulse-chase analysis in which cellular processes are examined over time by exposing the cells to a labeled compound (pulse) and then to the same compound in an unlabeled form (chase). Radioactivity is a commonly used label in these experiments. An important difference between pulse-chase analysis and bomb-pulse dating is the absence of the chase in the latter.

Around the year 2030 the bomb pulse will die out. Every organism born after this will not bear detectable bomb pulse traces and their cells cannot be dated in this way. Radioactive pulses cannot ethically be administered to people just to study the turnover of their cells so the bomb pulse results may be considered as a useful side effect of nuclear testing.

Applications 
The fact that cells and tissues reflect the doubling of 14C in the atmosphere during and after nuclear testing, has been of great use for several biological studies, for forensics and even for the determination of the year in which certain wine was produced.

Biology 
Biological studies carried out by Kirsty Spalding demonstrated that neuronal cells are essentially static and do not regenerate during life. She also showed that the number of fat cells is set during childhood and adolescence. Considering the amount of 14C present in DNA she could establish that 10% of fat cells are renewed annually. The radiocarbon bomb pulse has been used to validate otolith annuli (ages scored from otolith sections) across several fish species including the freshwater drum, lake sturgeon, pallid sturgeon, bigmouth buffalo, arctic salmonids, Pristipomoides filamentosus, several reef fishes, among numerous other validated freshwater and marine species. The precision for bomb radiocarbon age validation is typically within +/- 2 years because the rise period (1956-1960) is so steep. The bomb pulse has also been used to estimate (not validate) the age of Greenland sharks by measuring the incorporation of 14C in the eye lens during development. After having determined the age and measured the length of sharks born around the bomb pulse, it was possible to create a mathematical model in which length and age of the sharks were correlated in order to deduce the age of the larger sharks. The study showed that the Greenland shark, with an age of 392 +/- 120 years, is the oldest known vertebrate.

Forensics 
At the moment of death, carbon uptake is ended. Considering that tissue that contained the bomb pulse 14C was rapidly diminishing with a rate of 4% per year, it has been possible to establish the time of death of two women in a court case by examining tissues with a rapid turnover.  Another important application has been the identification of victims of the Southeast Asian tsunami 2004 by examining their teeth.

Carbon Transport Modeling 
The perturbation in atmospheric 14C from the bomb testing was an opportunity to validate atmospheric transport models, and to study the movement of carbon between the atmosphere and oceanic or terrestrial sinks.

Other 
Atmospheric bomb 14C has been used to validate tree ring ages and to date recent trees that have no annual growth rings.

See also 
 Effects of nuclear explosions
 Pulse-chase analysis

References 

Nuclear weapons
Nuclear weapons testing
Radioactivity
Molecular biology